The Tagin's  are one of the major tribes of Arunachal Pradesh, India, a member of the larger designation of Tani Tribes.The Tagin's, proud n independent in character, known for their strait forwardness,truthfulness courage n pure hearted.rich in traditional and culture 'The Tagin's refers to a tribe of North Eastern Region of india, the sate of Arunachal pradesh also known as the land of rising sun. Pride itself of myriads of tribes woven together. The Tagin's, which is member of the larger designation of Abo Tani Clane(Abo-Father, Tani-Ancestor's Name).most of Tagin's dominantly concentrated in Daporijo,upper subansiri district and some are also found in adjoining parts of West siang,mechuka and papum pare .In mechuka tagins are more populated than papum pare and west siang. The Tagin's ethnicity, are generally adherents of Donyi Poloism. 

(Donyi- sun,polo-moon) 

The most important festival of Tagin's 

Si-Donyi(si-earth and donyi-sun)involves the veneration of the earth(si) and the sun (donyi) which is being celebrated from 3rd of january to 8th of january and consider 5th and 6th as the main celebration day. Si-donyi is celebrated for the well being of community and man kind as a whole

And also for agriculture purpose. 

According to Tagin's si-earth and donyi -sun are the two supreme spiritual and providential authorities of this universe.they have full control over all God's and Goddesses and other spiritual forces. Both are believe to be the sole  ultimate symbole of truth and justice. The destiny of human being are controlled by them.it is believed that  nothing can happened on earth without theire blessing. In a nutshell, Si donyi's pleasure is humanity's sorrow. Thus, it is in the light of aforesaid belief and faith that the Tagin's worship Si-Donyi festival.

Location
Tagins are the dominant tribe in  Upper Subansiri district. They are also found dispersed in the adjoining districts, especially in West Siang, Papum Pare, in Arunachal Pradesh, as well as some areas of Tibet adjacent to Arunachal Pradesh. Since China took away some of the Arunchal area after the 1962 Sino-Indian War, there are Tagins present in Tibet who are included under Lhoba people.

Population 
According to 2011 census there are 68,534 Tagin people in India. A few thousand in Tibet is expected. There are many clans among the Tagins such as the following:Duchok,mosing-mosu,Tamin (Nakam, Nayam, Neva, Negia Nutik, Mindi (Nasi & Nalo) and Japo), Leyu, Reri, Natam-Gyadu (Bagang), Nah, Gyama, Tache-Tagia, Tasi,Dui, Topo, Tani-Tator, Cherom-Chera, Buning,  Heche, Kodak-Konia, Nalo, Pombu, Bagang (Nacho, Naji, Singming etc), Aiyeng (Payeng), Paji, Gumsing, Kojum abu and many more.

Language 
Tagin people speak their own local dialect which is Tagin. Although there are tonal variations among them, these variations causes no hurdle in understanding each other.

Religion
Originally the traditional Si-Donyism as a religion was being followed all around. Si-Dyoni comes from two words ‘Si,’ which means Earth; and ‘Dyoni,’ which means Sun. Which follows the cult of animism and ritualistic nature worshiping (similar to sanatan culture)in the form of spiritual deities where particular kind of animals or chickens are sacrificed at the altar (yogging-made out of the bamboos and wooden leaves with particular leaves or vines in stuffed shape) to please the spirits (very close to tamasic ways of Hinduism), more likely not anger them and keep them in their kind form. Priest or Nyibu shaman who are born with their powers are the ones who communicate and negotiate between the other world. They are the in between messenger from this world to other world. 

Recent years have seen mass conversions among members of the local community into Christianity, which has intensified Western influx in the culture, with more and more of the people embracing Western culture. Sadly this has led them to leave donyi-polo and it's tradition, culture, and even the dialect.

Festivals
The most important festival of the Tagins is the Si-Donyi Festival, which involves the god of the earth (si) and the goddess of sun (donyi). Si-Donyi is celebrated from 3 to 6 January every year. It is celebrated for the well being  of mankind with the coming new year where the nyibu (local priest) presides over and performs all the rituals with chanting of Uuyu Benam (celestial chants). And sacrifice of Mithuns before the god-goddess for peace and prosperity in the community as a whole.

Organisations 
Tagin Cultural Society (TCS) and Tagin Welfare Society (TWS) are the main parental organisation of the tribe. There are alsoyouth/student called All Tagin Students Union (ATSU) and All Tagin Youth Organisation (ATYO). The TWS or TCS also have many subgroups, and have been helping in shaping the future of the state.

References

Bibliography
 
 

Donyi-Polo communities
Upper Subansiri district